Wescott Road, also known as Westcoat Road, is a historic road located at Edisto Island, Charleston County, South Carolina. It represents the last undisturbed remnants of the main road on Edisto Island, and is an oak-lined dirt road approximately 2/5 mile in distance. The road was established in the Colonial era.  This section was isolated when S.C. Highway 174 was straightened and paved about 1940.

It was listed on the National Register of Historic Places in 1986.

References

Roads on the National Register of Historic Places in South Carolina
Buildings and structures in Charleston County, South Carolina
National Register of Historic Places in Charleston County, South Carolina